Yuechi County is a county in the east of Sichuan province, China, bordering Chongqing Municipality to the south. It is administratively governed by the prefecture-level city of Guang'an.

The place is accessible by bus from Chengdu and Nanchong. The town is essentially sustained by its livestock and agricultural activities, as well as agriculture-based manufacturing like bamboo-based carpet and beancurd, etc.; virtually without the presence of any significant industries.

The town is planned and constructed with a main road plying the town center, linking the exit to the Chengnan expressway at one end and other suburban areas at the other.

Climate

References

External links

 
County-level divisions of Sichuan
Guang'an